Erva-moura is a common name of Portuguese origin for several plants and may refer to:

Solanum americanum
Solanum nigrum